Edward Kemp may refer to:

 Edward Kemp (landscape architect) (1817–1891), English landscape architect
 Albert Edward Kemp (1858–1929), Canadian politician (usually known as Sir Edward Kemp)
 Edward Kemp (horticulturist) (1910–2012), Scottish horticulturist
 Edward Kemp (playwright) (born 1965), English playwright and theatre director, Director of RADA
 Ed Kemp (baseball), American baseball outfielder in the Negro leagues